Gregory R. Francis (born August 30, 1951 in Saint Croix) is an American Virgin Islands politician. A Democrat, he served as Lieutenant Governor of the United States Virgin Islands from January 1, 2007 to January 5, 2015, having been elected on a ticket with Governor John de Jongh.

Biography

Early life
Gregory Francis was born in Saint Croix on August 30, 1951, to Olric Francis and Hyacinth Wilson-Francis. He is one of seven siblings, the others of whom are Olrick, Herbert, Kathleen, Howard, Milton, Kenneth, and Arthur.

Francis attended Christiansted Grammar School, Christiansted High School and Saint Croix Central High School. He received a paralegal certificate from the University of the Virgin Islands in 1984 while serving in the United States Army.

Military career
Francis moved to New York City after graduation from high school, where he planned to attend a trade school. However, because of a one-year residency requirement for the school, Francis enlisted in the United States Army instead.

Francis would spend 27 years in the Army. He served as a Command Program Support Specialist, Supervisory Military Personal Specialist and a Recruiting and Retention Manager. He was stationed in Germany, Puerto Rico and the U.S. Virgin Islands during his military career.

References

1951 births
Democratic Party of the Virgin Islands politicians
Lieutenant Governors of the United States Virgin Islands
Living people
People from Saint Croix, U.S. Virgin Islands